Charles Ederson Parks (June 19, 1917 – September 13, 1987) was an American Negro league catcher in the 1930s and 1940s.

A native of Chester, South Carolina, Parks made his Negro leagues debut for the New York Black Yankees in 1938. He played with the Newark Eagles for several seasons, beginning in 1941. Parks served in the United States Army in World War II, and upon returning from service, rejoined Newark and played for the team during its 1946 Negro World Series championship season. He died in Salisbury, North Carolina in 1987 at age 70.

References

External links
 and Baseball-Reference Black Baseball stats and Seamheads

1917 births
1987 deaths
Baltimore Elite Giants players
New York Black Yankees players
Newark Eagles players
United States Army personnel of World War II
20th-century African-American sportspeople
Baseball catchers
African Americans in World War II
African-American United States Army personnel